This is a list of cases reported in volume 102 of United States Reports, decided by the Supreme Court of the United States from 1879 to 1881.

Justices of the Supreme Court at the time of 102 U.S. 

The Supreme Court is established by Article III, Section 1 of the Constitution of the United States, which says: "The judicial Power of the United States, shall be vested in one supreme Court . . .". The size of the Court is not specified; the Constitution leaves it to Congress to set the number of justices. Under the Judiciary Act of 1789 Congress originally fixed the number of justices at six (one chief justice and five associate justices). Since 1789 Congress has varied the size of the Court from six to seven, nine, ten, and back to nine justices (always including one chief justice).

When the cases in 102 U.S. were decided the Court comprised nine of the following ten members at one time (William Burnham Woods replaced William Strong in January 1881):

Notable Case in 102 U.S.

Springer v. United States
In Springer v. United States, 102 U.S. 586 (1881), the Supreme Court upheld the federal income tax imposed under the Revenue Act of 1864. The Court rejected Springer's argument that the income tax imposed by the 1864 statute was a direct tax not apportioned among the states according to the population of each state, as required under Article One of the United States Constitution; it held that "direct taxes, within the meaning of the Constitution, are only capitation taxes, as expressed in that instrument, and taxes on real estate; and that the tax of which [Springer] complains is within the category of an excise or duty".

Citation style 

Under the Judiciary Act of 1789 the federal court structure at the time comprised District Courts, which had general trial jurisdiction; Circuit Courts, which had mixed trial and appellate (from the US District Courts) jurisdiction; and the United States Supreme Court, which had appellate jurisdiction over the federal District and Circuit courts—and for certain issues over state courts. The Supreme Court also had limited original jurisdiction (i.e., in which cases could be filed directly with the Supreme Court without first having been heard by a lower federal or state court). There were one or more federal District Courts and/or Circuit Courts in each state, territory, or other geographical region.

Bluebook citation style is used for case names, citations, and jurisdictions.
 e.g.,"C.C.D.N.J." = United States Circuit Court for the District of New Jersey
 e.g.,"D. Mass." = United States District Court for the District of Massachusetts
 "E." = Eastern; "M." = Middle; "N." = Northern; "S." = Southern; "W." = Western
 e.g.,"C.C.S.D.N.Y." = United States Circuit Court for the Southern District of New York
 e.g.,"M.D. Ala." = United States District Court for the Middle District of Alabama
 "Ct. Cl." = United States Court of Claims
 The abbreviation of a state's name alone indicates the highest appellate court in that state's judiciary at the time.
 e.g.,"Pa." = Supreme Court of Pennsylvania
 e.g.,"Me." = Supreme Judicial Court of Maine

List of cases in 102 U.S.

Notes and references

External links
  Case reports in volume 102 from Library of Congress
  Case reports in volume 102 from Court Listener
  Case reports in volume 102 from the Caselaw Access Project of Harvard Law School
  Case reports in volume 102 from Google Scholar
  Case reports in volume 102 from Justia
  Case reports in volume 102 from Open Jurist
 Website of the United States Supreme Court
 United States Courts website about the Supreme Court
 National Archives, Records of the Supreme Court of the United States
 American Bar Association, How Does the Supreme Court Work?
 The Supreme Court Historical Society

1879 in United States case law
1880 in United States case law
1881 in United States case law